Minuscule 651 (in the Gregory-Aland numbering), ε 1187 (von Soden), is a Greek minuscule manuscript of the New Testament, on parchment. Palaeographically it has been assigned to the 11th century. The manuscript has complex contents.
Scrivener labelled it by 874e.

Description 

The codex contains the text of the four Gospels, on 190 parchment leaves (size ). The text is written in one column per page, 25 lines per page.

Some corrections were made by a later hand on the margin.

Text 

The Greek text of the codex is a representative of the Byzantine text-type. Hermann von Soden classified it as a member of the textual family Kx. Kurt Aland placed it in Category V. According to the Wisse's Profile Method it represents textual group M651.

History 

Gregory dated the manuscript to the 11th or 12th century. Currently the manuscript is dated by the INTF to the 11th century.

C. R. Gregory saw the manuscript in 1889.

The manuscript currently is housed at the Anhalt. Landesbücherei, s. n., at Dessau.

See also 

 List of New Testament minuscules
 Biblical manuscript
 Textual criticism

References

Further reading 

 

Greek New Testament minuscules
11th-century biblical manuscripts